Doris Vickers (born 1980) is an Austrian archaeoastronomer and content manager for the Unesco Portal to the Heritage of Astronomy.

She was a global co-ordinator of the Ancient Skies project, along with Ruediger Schulz.

In February 2016 she appeared on BBC Radio 4's The Museum of Curiosity. Her hypothetical donation to this imaginary museum was a star clock.

Publications

References

External links

1980 births
Living people
Archaeoastronomers
Women astronomers
Austrian women scientists